Necrophagia was an American death metal band. The band is credited as one of the inaugural groups within the death metal genre, along with Possessed and Death.

History

Early years (1983–1997)
Necrophagia was formed by Frank "Killjoy" Pucci in 1983. The band name is derived from the act of cannibalizing, or eating a corpse. Necrophagia was a popular group in the underground extreme metal "tape trading" scene. Their first full-length album, Season of the Dead, was recorded and released in 1987. In 1990, Necrophagia intended to issue an album named Ready for Death, which had been recorded in 1986. But, the band split up, and Ready for Death was bootlegged in the tape trading scene. Ready for Death was finally released as part of the A Legacy of Horror, Gore and Sickness compilation album in 2000.

Phil Anselmo era (1997–2001)
Killjoy befriended Pantera frontman Phil Anselmo, shortly after Necrophagia's demise. Phil wrote and shared some music with Killjoy, which persuaded him to resurrect Necrophagia in 1997. Killjoy and Anselmo (who played guitar under the pseudonym Anton Crowley) were joined by Wayne Fabra on drums and Dustin Havnen on bass guitar. Necrophagia released Holocausto de la Morte, as well as the Black Blood Vomitorium EP, with the reformed line-up. Havnen was replaced by Jared Faulk in 2001. In addition, the group enlisted Gorelord leader Frediablo as second guitarist, and Opal Enthroned on keyboards. Necrophagia released the Cannibal Holocaust EP in 2001, along with their first DVD, Through Eyes of the Dead. Anselmo, Opal and Fabra departed the band shortly after the release. In addition, the Housecore/Baphomet Records label founded by Killjoy and Anselmo was dissolved, due to extreme scheduling conflicts and previous commitments.

Frediablo era (2002–2006)
Killjoy and Frediablo remained with Necrophagia. In 2002, the band added Fug (Frediablo's brother) on guitar, Iscariah (formerly of Immortal) on bass guitar, Titta Tanni (of Daemonia/New Goblin fame) on drums and Mirai Kawashima (of the Japanese avant-garde black metal band Sigh) on keyboards. Necrophagia released The Divine Art of Torture, Harvest Ritual Vol. 1 and the Goblins Be Thine EP with the line-up. In addition, Necrophagia released their first live album Slit Wrists And Casket Rot, which was recorded during their "Harvesting the Dead" tour.

Frediablo left the band in early 2006 to concentrate on Gorelord. He was replaced by Undead Torment.

Recent activity
Necrophagia released Death Trip 69 in May 2011. The album featured several guest appearances, including Casey Chaos from Amen, and former Mayhem vocalist Maniac. WhiteWorm Cathedral was released in October 2014. Necrophagia supported 1349 on their "Chaos Raids North America" tour in May and June 2015. 

On March 18, 2018, vocalist and founding member Killjoy died at the age of 51.

Members

Final lineup
 Shawn Slusarek – drums (2010–2018)
 Serge Streltsov – guitars (2016–2018)
 Jake Arnette – bass (2016–2018)
Frank "Killjoy" Pucci – vocals (1983–1987, 1998–2018; died 2018)

Former
 Scrimm – guitars (2012–2015)
 Abigail Lee Nero – guitars (2011–2014)
 Boris Randall – guitars (2010–2011)
 Undead Torment – guitars (2006–2011)
 Fug – guitars (2002–2010)
 Frediablo – guitars (2002–2005)
 Anton Crowley (Philip Anselmo) – guitars (1998–2001)
 Larry "Madthrash" Madison – guitars (1984–1987)
 Damien Matthews – bass (2010–2015)
 Iscariah – bass (2002–2010)
 Jared Faulk – bass (2001)
 Dustin Havnen – bass (1998–2001)
 Bill "Blaster" Bork – bass (1984–1987)
 Titta Tani – drums (2002–2010)
 Wayne Fabra – drums (1998–2002)
 Joe "Voyer" Blazer – drums (1984–1987)
 Mirai Kawashima – keyboards (2002–2008; 2014)
 Opal Enthroned – keyboards (2001, 2008–2011)
 Steve Lehocky – guitars (2015–2016)

Discography

Studio albums
Season of the Dead (1987)
Holocausto de la Morte (1998)
The Divine Art of Torture (2003)
Harvest Ritual Volume I (2005)
Deathtrip 69 (2011)
WhiteWorm Cathedral (2014)

Other releases
Death Is Fun (compilation) (1995)
Black Blood Vomitorium (EP) (2000)
A Legacy of Horror, Gore and Sickness (compilation) (2000)
Cannibal Holocaust (EP) (2001)
Reverse Voices of the Dead (split EP with Antaeus) (2001)
Goblins Be Thine (EP) (2004)
Slit Wrists and Casket Rot (live) (2006)
Here Lies Necrophagia: 35 Years of Death Metal (compilation) (2019)

Timeline

References

External links

American death metal musical groups
Heavy metal musical groups from Ohio
Musical groups established in 1983
Musical groups disestablished in 2018
1983 establishments in Ohio
2018 disestablishments in Ohio
Musical quintets
Season of Mist artists